Aughton may refer to several places in England:
 Aughton, East Riding of Yorkshire
 Aughton, Lancashire, a parish in the borough of West Lancashire
 Aughton, Lancaster, a hamlet in the civil parish of Halton-with-Aughton, Lancashire
 Aughton, South Yorkshire
 Aughton, Wiltshire